WinDirStat is a free and open-source graphical disk usage analyzer for Microsoft Windows. It presents a sub-tree view with disk-use percentage alongside a usage-sorted list of file extensions that is interactively integrated with a colorful graphical display (a treemap). Created as an open-source project released under the GNU GPL, it was developed using Visual C++/MFC 7.0 and distributed using SourceForge. The project was inspired by SequoiaView, an application based on research done by the Visualization Section of the Faculty of Mathematics and Computer Science at the Technische Universiteit Eindhoven.

Popularity 
WinDirStat has been downloaded more than 9.2 million times from the official source since the original release in October 2003. As of July 2014, it was the second most downloaded "Filesystems" software on SourceForge, with more than 13,000 downloads per week.

Project status 
Development stopped for some time after a release in September 2007. Development was resumed in May 2009, and the code was updated in 2016.

Source code 
Source code is provided for all released versions on the SourceForge page in ZIP format.

WinDirStat is developed via Mercurial revision control.

Features
 List of detected file extensions, and the percentage of space each file extension takes up. 
 Each extension has its own color on the graphical map.
 Is able to scan internal, external and networked drives. 
 Portable version besides the installer
 User-created clean up jobs
 Send report via email

Version history

Media reception 
FossHub (official download mirror of WinDirStat) reported 6,912,000 downloads in January 2019, being the most downloaded software from "Disk Analysers" category."

Steve Bass of PC World provided a brief review of the 1.1.2 release of WinDirStat, summarizing its usefulness: "Windirstat is [a] colorful and nifty tool to check the makeup of your hard drive -- especially if you're looking for immense files.  It scans your drive and produces a treemap that shows each file as a colored rectangle that's proportional to the file's size..."

In 2006, WinDirStat was "Download of the day" on Lifehacker. Reviewer Adam Pash praised WinDirStat for its ability to easily clean up unnecessary files, by stating: "If you find a large file or two taking up loads of space that you had forgotten was there and don't need, it's easy to clean up directly from WinDirStat. "

CNET reviewed the most recent release of WinDirStat and gave it 5 of 5 stars. It called WinDirStat a "great piece of freeware" and noted: "It's one of those tools that you didn't know you needed until you started using it, but once installed, it's hard to imagine life without it..."

Gizmo's Freeware directory featured WinDirStat in a January 2010 list of best free disk analysis software with a 4 of 5 stars review, noting: "The open source program WinDirStat  is [an] outstanding program. It uses three ways to display the disk usage: a directory list, a file extension list and a rectangular treemap. The visual presentation, overall usability and scan speed makes this a great tool to visualize disk usage."

The German computer magazine  c't (magazin für computertechnik) published a review of WinDirStat with it bundled in a CD in October 2006.

In 2011, Jack Wallen from TechRepublic called WinDirStat: "one of those simple little apps you are going to be very thankful you have when you need it." He also highlighted its usability: "If space is an issue ... you will see just how much time this tool can save you." However, Jack Wallen criticized the documentation, stating: "The biggest issue with WinDirStat is the documentation. The minute you try to create your own user-configured cleanup routines you will quickly experience a complete lack of documentation, which makes the task rather challenging, if not impossible."

References

External links 

Official Mercurial source code repository
Lifehacker download of the day

2003 software
Disk usage analysis software
Free system software
Portable software